Arnie Paul Robinson Jr. (April 7, 1948 – December 1, 2020) was an American athlete. He won a bronze medal in the long jump at the 1972 Olympics and a gold medal in 1976.

Early life and education
Arnie Paul Robinson Jr. was born in San Diego in 1948. He mother, Verneater Robinson, worked as a volunteer at Mount Zion Missionary Baptist Church in San Diego. Robinson stayed in the San Diego area throughout his career, first at Samuel F. B. Morse High School, then San Diego Mesa College and San Diego State University, where he was the 1970 NCAA Men's Outdoor Track and Field Champion in the long jump.

Athletic Career
The following year, in 1971, Robinson won his first USA Outdoor Track and Field Championships title, representing the San Diego Track Club.  That qualified him to go to the Athletics at the 1971 Pan American Games, where he won the Gold Medal.  In 1972 he won the USA Championships again, this time representing the U.S. Army.  That was the first time he qualified for the Olympic team winning the Olympic Trials.  In Munich that year he was third in the Olympics behind youngster Randy Williams who was setting the still standing World Junior Record in the long jump.  Then starting in 1975, Robinson went on to win four straight USA Outdoor Championships, representing an assortment of clubs.  The 1975 championship qualified Robinson to again go to the Pan Am Games, where he won the silver medal behind the first of 4 jumping gold medals for João Carlos de Oliveira of Brazil.  In 1976, he bested Williams in both the Olympic Trials and the Olympics, taking home the Gold Medal and a career best 8.35m jump.  In 1977, his National Championship qualified him to go to the first ever World Cup meet in Düsseldorf, where he again took home Gold.

Teaching Career
As of 2005, he was teaching physical education courses at Mesa College in San Diego. He was previously the head track coach at Mesa College, starting in 1982.

Honors 
In 2000, Robinson was elected into the USATF National Track and Field Hall of Fame. He was voted into the San Diego Sport Association's Breitbard Hall of Fame in 1984, and the California Community College Athletic Association Track and Field Hall of Fame in 2007.

On April 13, 2013, San Diego Mesa College honored the Olympian Long Jumper by naming their Invitational (Arnie Robinson Invite hosted in San Diego at Mesa College)  after him, and presenting him with an award.

Personal life 
Early in 2000, he was seriously injured in an auto accident when a drunk driver hit his car. After he recovered he became the coach of the USA Track & Field long jump team at the 2003 world championships. In 2005. he was diagnosed with a form of brain cancer, glioblastoma, and told he would only live another 6 months. Later in life he took up a new hobby, building houses. His first marriage to Cynthia Eley ended in divorce. He has a son, Paul, born shortly before Robinson retired from competing. He had three sisters and a younger brother who died in 2011.

Death
Robinson began to have trouble breathing and excessive coughing around mid-November 2020. He died on December 1, 2020, at the age of 72, after contracting COVID-19 during the COVID-19 pandemic in San Diego.

References

External links
 
 

1948 births
American male long jumpers
2020 deaths
Athletes (track and field) at the 1972 Summer Olympics
Athletes (track and field) at the 1976 Summer Olympics
Athletes (track and field) at the 1971 Pan American Games
Athletes (track and field) at the 1975 Pan American Games
Olympic gold medalists for the United States in track and field
Olympic bronze medalists for the United States in track and field
Track and field athletes from San Diego
Medalists at the 1976 Summer Olympics
Medalists at the 1972 Summer Olympics
Pan American Games gold medalists for the United States
Pan American Games silver medalists for the United States
San Diego State Aztecs men's track and field athletes
Pan American Games medalists in athletics (track and field)
Universiade medalists in athletics (track and field)
Universiade silver medalists for the United States
Medalists at the 1970 Summer Universiade
Deaths from the COVID-19 pandemic in California
Medalists at the 1971 Pan American Games
Medalists at the 1975 Pan American Games